USS Justin may refer to the following ships of the United States Navy:

 , was a steamship purchased by the US Navy 27 April 1898 and decommissioned 20 December 1915
 , was a cargo ship acquired by the US Navy 2 September 1945 and sold 25 May 1954

United States Navy ship names